"Miracles" is the twelfth single to be released by Japanese singer Ken Hirai. It was released on February 15, 2001. The track appears on Hirai's fourth studio album, Gaining Through Losing.

Track list
Miracles
Written and composed by Ken Hirai.
Tug of War
Written and composed by Ken Hirai and Masahito Nakano.
Miracles/K.H.'Jazz (featuring Toku)
Tug of War (United Future Organization remix)
Miracles (less vocal)

2001 singles
Ken Hirai songs
Songs written by Ken Hirai
2001 songs
Defstar Records singles